The New House is a 1953 painting by Australian artist John Brack. The painting depicts a man and a woman standing in front of their fireplace in a room.

The work "pervades a sense of flatness, embodied by Brack's smooth application of paint, emphasising the clean, sparse qualities of the room."

Previously part of the Grundy collection, the Art Gallery of New South Wales acquired the work in 2013 for A$1.6 million.

References

Paintings by John Brack
Collections of the Art Gallery of New South Wales
1953 paintings